As-Salam Palace, in Baghdad, Iraq
 Al Salam Palace (Kuwait), in Shuwaikh, Kuwait

See also
 Al Alam Palace, Old Muscat, Oman